Wilhelm-Günther Vahrson (born May 1955, Iserlohn) is a German geographer and academic. Since 1997 he has been the president of the Hochschule für nachhaltige Entwicklung Eberswalde.

References

External links
http://www.zeit.de/studium/hochschule/2010-03/nachhaltigkeit-hochschule-Eberswalde

German geographers
Living people
Academic staff of the Eberswalde University for Sustainable Development
1955 births
People from Iserlohn